Elections to Brighton and Hove Borough Council on the south coast of England were held on 6 May 1999.

Results

Ward breakdown

Brunswick and Adelaide

Goldsmid

Hangleton

Hanover

Hollingbury

Kings Cliff

Marine

Moulsecoomb

Nevill

North Portslade

Patcham

Portslade South

Preston

Queens Park

Regency

Rottingdean
(7927)3
vote share
Hunt B.* Con 2,232 60.2
Hyde L. Ms. Con 2,129 -
Smith D. Con 2,090 -
Bunting M. Lab 697 18.8
Moriarty J. Lab 670 -
Avis A. Lab 611 -
Hampton M. Ms. LD 535 14.4
De Souza J. Ms. LD 369 -
Desouza H. LD 360 -
Kelley V. Ms. Green 245 6.6
Gilson A. Ms. Green 177 -
Tart N. Green 137 -
Turnout 46.2 41.4

Seven Dials
(7946)3
vote share
Gwyn-Jones L. Ms.* Lab 1,222 47.0
Hermititge A. Ms. Lab 1,145 -
Middleton M.* Lab 1,103 -
Berrington J. Green 619 23.8
Holmes B. Ms. Green 440 -
Gowans J. Con 435 16.7
Bowes P. Con 428 -
Larkin R. Ms. Con 402 -
Huggins B. LD 324 12.5
Needham I. Green 312 -
Turnout 29.8 23.2

St. Peters
(7926)3
vote share
West P.* Green 1,715 49.3
Child R. Green 1,498 -
Taylor K. Green 1,488 -
Newman D. Ms. Lab 1,302 37.4
Prentice S. Ms. Lab 1,258 -
Spillman H. Lab 1,250 -
Cripps R. Con 271 7.8
Maclean E. Ms. Con 262 -
Maclean I. Con 237 -
Parker W. LD 190 5.5
Turnout 42.3 11.9

Stanford
(6708)3
vote share
Brown V. Ms. Con 1,680 62.5
Bennet D. Con 1,626 -
Rowe B.* Con 1,161 -
Jackson D. Lab 782 29.1
Walshe A. Lab 724 -
Jenkins R. Lab 687 -
Richardson G. Green 225 8.4
La Masurier J. Ms. Green 225 -
Stone P. Green 91 -
Turnout 39.0 33.4

Stanmer
(7971)3
vote share
Framoze T.* Lab 1,372 46.2
Hawkes P. Ms.* Lab 1,328 -
Beishon G. Ms. Lab 1,270 -
Careless D. Con 1,099 37.0
Macabe R. Con 1,029 -
Pidgeon B. Con 1,018 -
Clayden L. Ms. Green 260 8.8
Rimmington J. Ms. LD 238 8.0
Lench K. Green 157 -
Tofts P. Green 117 -
Turnout 36.7 9.2

Tenantry
(7809)3
vote share
Baassam S.* Lab 1,423 56.0
Ballance J.* Lab 1,326 -
Durr A.* Lab 1,260 -
Dando B. Con 441 17.4
Chapman K. Ms. Green 436 17.2
Middleton I. Con 423 -
Read D. Con 397 -
Mulligan P. Green 323 -
Rawlinson H. Ms. Green 254 -
Weller P. LD 239 9.4
Turnout 31.7 38.7

Vallance
(7454)3
vote share
Battle S.* Lab 1,066 38.2
Walshe B. Ms.* Lab 1,018 -
WarmanBrown
F. Ms.* Lab 966 -
Milward A. Con 889 31.8
Frankland J. Con 889 -
Young J. Ms. Con 858 -
Denyer P. LD 396 14.2
Abrahams M. Green 329 11.8
Mueller M. Green 199 -
Porter J. Ms. Green 171 -
Biggs D. Ind 114 4.1
Turnout 32.1 6.3

Westbourne
(7277)3
vote share
Oxley B.* Con 1,305 43.7
Cobb D. Ms. Con 1,270 -
Kemble E. Con 1,242 -
Vizor V. Lab 1,091 36.5
Fisher M. Lab 1,043 -
Newington J. Lab 1,002 -
Lake J. Ms. LD 299 10.0
Baker N. Green 292 9.8
Da Costa J. Ms. Green 201 -
Powell V. Green 136 -
Turnout 38.8 7.2

Westdene
(7675)3
vote share
Drake J.* Con 1,845 52.3
Drake P. Ms.* Con 1,821 -
Norman A. Ms.* Con 1,775 -
Kidd S. Ms. Lab 972 27.5
Martin K. Lab 842 -
Patterson J. Lab 811 -
Huckle E. Green 377 10.7
Lovatt J. LD 336 9.5
McBeth D. LD 310 -
Poole P. Green 206 -
Sorrell S. Green 178 -
Turnout 45.2 24.7

Wish
(6792)3
vote share
James H. Ms.* Lab 1,393 42.2
Peltz-Dunn G. Con 1,366 41.4
Murphy P.* Lab 1,356 -
Conway S. Ms. Con 1,347 -
Balchin R. Con 1,340 -
Pratt A.* Lab 1,299 -
Dickens S. Ms. Green 281 8.5
Murray B. Ms. LD 260 7.9
Henton J. Ms. Green 171 -
Rowe K. Ms. Green 138 -
Turnout 46.7 0.8

Woodingdean
(7464)3
vote share
Wells G.* Con 2,045 48.6
Stiles P. Ms.* Con 1,900 -
Simson D. Ms. Con 1,857 -
Moorhouse J. Ms.* Lab 1,670 39.7
Blackwood R. Lab 1,431 -
Barraclough L. Lab 1,381 -
Edwards P. LD 267 6.3
Cummings J. Green 223 5.3
Field S. Green 155 -
Humphries E. Ms. Green 127 -
Turnout 54.3 8.9

References

1990s in East Sussex
1999 English local elections
Brighton and Hove City Council elections